Meliosma beusekomii is an extinct species of Meliosma from the middle Eocene (44 Ma) Clarno Formation of central Oregon

References

Cenozoic plants
beusekomii
Clarno Formation